Dennis J. Sullivan (June 26, 1858 – December 31, 1925) was an American utility player in Major League Baseball, playing mainly as a third baseman for the Providence Grays and Boston Red Caps of the National League. A native of Boston, Massachusetts, Sullivan attended Boston College and College of the Holy Cross.

In a six-game career, Sullivan was a .261 hitter (6-for-23) with six runs, three RBI, and two doubles without home runs. He made six appearances as a third baseman (4), catcher (1) and left fielder (1), and was a member of the Providence 1879 National League champions.

Sullivan died at the age of 67 in his homeland of Boston, Massachusetts.

See also
1879 Providence Grays season
1880 Boston Red Caps season

External links
Baseball Reference
Retrosheet

1858 births
1925 deaths
Boston Red Caps players
Providence Grays players
Boston College Eagles baseball players
Holy Cross Crusaders baseball players
Major League Baseball third basemen
Baseball players from Boston
19th-century baseball players
Lowell (minor league baseball) players
Albany (minor league baseball) players